Panchanand Pathak (P.N. Pathak) is an Indian politician and a member of 18th Legislative Assembly of Kushinagar, Uttar Pradesh of India. He represents the Kushinagar constituency of Uttar Pradesh and is a member of the Bharatiya Janata Party. He was the formal regional vice president of Gorakhpur area.

Posts held

See also
Uttar Pradesh Legislative Assembly

References

Uttar Pradesh MLAs 2022–2027
Bharatiya Janata Party politicians from Uttar Pradesh
Living people
Year of birth missing (living people)
People from Kushinagar district